Svetislav Perduv (born 8 March 1959) is a retired Yugoslav football defender and manager.

Playing career

Club
Born in Zenica, Bosnia and Herzegovina, Socialist Federal Republic of Yugoslavia, Perduv played club football for NK Olimpija Ljubljana and NK Čelik Zenica in the Yugoslav First League. After that he moved to France and represent FC Chaumont in Division 3. At age 29, he moved to Portugal where he remained until his retirement, appearing for A.D. Fafe , Vitoria de Guimaraes , and C.F. União in the top division, and Académico de Viseu, Académica de Coimbra and A.D. Ovarense.

Managerial career
In 1995, Perduv started his coaching and football manager career. He is also an official Fifa agent. He was named assistant to manager Alfredo Casimiro at Sloboda Tuzla in October 2014.

References

External links
Profile at Strukljeva
1974/75 season in Yugoslavia 

1959 births
Living people
Association football defenders
Bosnia and Herzegovina footballers
Yugoslav footballers
NK Čelik Zenica players
NK Olimpija Ljubljana (1945–2005) players
AD Fafe players
C.F. União players
Académico de Viseu F.C. players
Associação Académica de Coimbra – O.A.F. players
A.D. Ovarense players
Yugoslav First League players
Primeira Liga players
Bosnia and Herzegovina expatriate footballers
Yugoslav expatriate footballers
Expatriate footballers in France
Yugoslav expatriate sportspeople in France
Expatriate footballers in Portugal
Bosnia and Herzegovina expatriate sportspeople in Portugal
Association football agents